1830–1835 Thomas Hardwicke collaborates with John Edward Gray in the publication of Illustrations of Indian Zoology
John Gould publishes A Century of Birds from the Himalaya Mountains (1830–1832)
Settlement of Chichi-jima begins leading to the extinction of the Bonin grosbeak
Death of  Joseph Philippe de Clairville and Charles Dumont de Sainte-Croix
Karl Michahelles describes the  western rock nuthatch
Ferdinand Heine senior begins assembling a bird museum. It becomes one of the largest 19th-century collections :de:Museum Heineanum
Jacob Ernst von Reider and Carl Wilhelm Hahn begin Fauna Boica, oder gemeinnützige Naturgeschichte der Thiere Bayerns
Joshua Brookes publishes Museum Brookesianum Embracing an Almost Endless Assemblage of Every Species of Anatomical, Pathological, Obstetrical, and Zootomical Preparations, as well as Subjects in Natural History
A long known mixture of arsenic and soap used by taxidermists is popularized  as the Bécœur recipe.

Ongoing events
Coenraad Jacob Temminck  Nouveau recueil de planches coloriées d'oiseaux Birds first described in this work in 1830 include the garnet pitta, the copper pheasant, the brown barbet, the blue-banded kingfisher, the Japanese wood-pigeon and the brown-eared bulbul
René Primevère Lesson Traite d'Ornithologie

Birding and ornithology by year
1830 in science